Georges Ball (September 11, 1838 – May 30, 1928), also known as George Ball, was a Canadian politician and lumber merchant.

Born in Champlain, Lower Canada, Ball was a member of the Legislative Assembly of Quebec for Nicolet from 1897 to 1900. He was elected to the House of Commons of Canada as a Member of the Conservative Party of Canada in the 1900 federal election for the riding of Nicolet. He was defeated in the 1904 federal election and again in the 1906 Nicolet by-election.

By-election: On Mr. Lemieux being elected to sit for Gaspé, 3 December 1906

References
 
 

1838 births
1928 deaths
Conservative Party of Canada (1867–1942) MPs
Conservative Party of Quebec MNAs
Members of the House of Commons of Canada from Quebec
People from Mauricie